Dinera ferina (Fallen) is a species of fly in the family Tachinidae. In June 2018, the Bulletin of Insectology wrote that Dinera ferina was "confirmed to be a parasitoid of larvae of the two Italian Platycerus species, Platycerus caprea (De Geer) and Platycerus caraboides (L.) (Coleoptera Lucanidae)."

References

Diptera of Europe
Dexiinae
Insects described in 1817